Provincial Highway 62 is an expressway that begins in Anle District, Keelung City, and ends in Ruifang District, New Taipei City. Its length is 19.046 km, or 11.835 miles.

The expressway opened on June 29, 2007 and has a speed limit of 80km/h (50mph).

Major Cities Along the Route
Keelung City
New Taipei City

Exit list
{| class="plainrowheaders wikitable"
|-
!scope=col|City
!scope=col|Location
!scope=col|km
!scope=col|Mile
!scope=col|Exit
!scope=col|Name
!scope=col|Destinations
!scope=col|Notes
|-

Branch Line
The branch line (Provincial Highway No. 62A) starts at Keelung Harbor and ends at Sijiaoting. Its length is 5.744 km.

{| class="plainrowheaders wikitable"
|-
!scope=col|City
!scope=col|Location
!scope=col|km
!scope=col|Mile
!scope=col|Exit
!scope=col|Name
!scope=col|Destinations
!scope=col|Notes
|-

See also
 Highway system in Taiwan

References

http://www.thb.gov.tw/

Highways in Taiwan